Perchelehzar (also Romanized as Perchelehzār; also known as Ḩoseynābād-e Solţānī and Perchelīzār) is a village in Dodangeh Rural District, in the Central District of Behbahan County, Khuzestan Province, Iran. At the 2006 census, its population was 211, in 41 families.

References 

Populated places in Behbahan County